The Miss Utah's Outstanding Teen competition is the pageant that selects the representative for the U.S. state of Utah in the Miss America's Outstanding Teen pageant. 

JayLynn Lindley of Salem was crowned Miss Utah's Teen on February 18th, 2023 at the Covey Center for the Arts in Provo, Utah. She will competed for the title of Miss America's Teen 2024.

In January of 2023, the official name of the pageant went from Miss Utah's Outstanding Teen to Miss Utah's Teen.

Placements 
The following is a visual summary of the past results of Miss Utah's Outstanding Teen titleholders presented in the table below. The year in parentheses indicates year of the Miss America's Teen competition in which the placement and/or award was garnered.
 1st runners-up: Lindsey Brinton (2008)
 4th runners-up: Jennifer Gulbrandsen (2006)
 Top 10: Meredith Gaufin (2010), Tiare Keeno (2012)
Top 11: Charlee Sorensen (2022), Jocelyn Osmond (2023)
 Top 15: Marisa Nielsen (2011)

Awards

Preliminary awards 
 Preliminary Evening Wear/On-Stage Question: Jessica Richards (2013)
 Preliminary Lifestyle and Fitness: Lindsey Brinton (2008), McKenna Lewis (2009)
 Preliminary Talent: Jennifer Gulbrandsen (2006), Jessica Richards (2013), Charlee Sorensen (2022)

Non-finalist awards 
 Non-finalist Evening Wear/On-Stage Question: Jessica Richards (2013)
 Non-finalist Talent: Jessica Richards (2013), JessiKate Riley (2015)

Other awards 
 Academic Life: Meredith Gaufin (2010)
 America's Choice: Jocelyn Osmond (2023)
 Outstanding Instrumental Talent: Claire Inouye (2020)
 Random Acts of Kindness Award: Claire Inouye (2020)
 Teens in Action Award Winners: Tiare Keeno (2012)
Top Vocal Talent Award: Charlee Sorensen (2022)

Winners

Notes

References

External links

Utah
Utah culture
Women in Utah
Annual events in Utah
2005 establishments in Utah